Nina Cassian (pen name of Renée Annie Cassian-Mătăsaru; 27 November 1924, in Galați – 14 April 2014, in New York City) was a Romanian poet, children's book writer, translator, journalist, accomplished pianist and composer, and film critic. She spent the first sixty years of her life in Romania until she moved to the United States in 1985 for a teaching job. A few years later Cassian was granted permanent asylum and New York City became her home for the rest of her life. Much of her work was published both in Romanian and in English.

Life and Work

Early life
Nina Cassian was born into a Jewish family in Galați in 1924, the only child of Iosif Cassian-Mătăsaru, a translator, and an amateur singer. In 1926 the family moved to Brașov. Cassian's fascination with languages is said to date back to that time of her childhood since this is when she started spending time with children from the German and Hungarian community. In 1935, the family moved to Bucharest, where Cassian attended a girl's high school in the Jewish neighborhood.

Over the years she took drawing lessons with George Loewendal and M. H. Maxy, acting lessons with Beate Fredanov and Alexandru Finți, piano and musical composition lessons with Theodor Fuchs, Paul Jelescu, Mihail Jora, and Constantin Silvestri.

In 1944 she entered the Literature Department of the University of Bucharest, but abandoned her studies after one year.

Life in Communist Romania
In the mid-40s Cassian started to find her place in the literary scene in Romania. She was married to the young poet Vladimir Colin in 1943 (their marriage lasted until 1948) and had a very close relation with Ion Barbu. Most interestingly though, Cassian also formed a very close friendship with the famous poet Paul Celan during the time he lived in Bucharest (1945–1947). Along with other writers and artists, Celan and Cassian played surrealist games such as "Questions and Answers" or "Ioachim", which is the Bucharest version of André Breton's famous game, Exquisite corpse. Cassian and Celan bonded over their fascination for languages and used multilingualism as an inspiration for their work.

In 1945 Cassian published her first poem, Am fost un poet decadent ("I Used to Be a Decadent Poet") in the daily România Liberă, and her first poetry collection, La scara 1/1 ("Scale 1:1") in 1947. These early publications were greatly influenced by French modernist poets she had spent time with, especially the surrealist writers are said to have had a lasting influence on Cassian. It was labeled "decadent poetry" in a Scînteia article in 1948. Scared by that fierce criticism, she then turned to writing in the proletkult and socialist-realistic fashion. This phase lasted for about eight years.

This is also when Cassian turned to writing children's books, such as Copper Red and the Seven Dachsies (which was published in English in 1985 after it had become a bestseller in Romania), and children's stories, such as Tigrino and Tigrene (which was written in verse and published in English in 1986, adapted from the Romanian original Povestea a doi pui de tigru, numiţi Ninigra şi Aligru). In an interview in 1986, she explains why she made the choice to focus on children's literature: “It was in 1950, during the dogmatic period in Romania. Socialist realism is, unfortunately, characterized by the restraining of structures and styles and vocabulary. [...] So when I was asked to write in a rigid and simplified manner, I tried to do my best, but after awhile, I switched to literature for children because it was the only field where metaphors were still allowed, where imagination was tolerated and assonance was permitted.” At least some of her children's stories and books have been translated to English but are not available in bookstores anymore today.

Cassian was later married to Al. I. Ștefănescu. Although born into a Jewish family, he was Romanian Orthodox, and during their marriage, she stated that she was much closer to his religion than to Judaism, and that she had never read a page of the Talmud.

Emigration and life in the USA
Cassian travelled to the United States as a visiting professor for creative writing at New York University in 1985. During her stay in America, a friend of hers, Gheorghe Ursu, was arrested and subsequently beaten to death by the Securitate for possessing a diary. The diary contained several of Cassian's poems which satirized the Communist regime and the authorities thought to be inflammatory. Hence, she decided to remain in the US.

She was granted asylum in the United States, and continued to live in New York City. Eventually, she became an American citizen.

In the US, she started writing poems in English and published in The New Yorker, The Atlantic Monthly and other magazines. Some of these poems were also published in collections, for example Life Sentence in 1990 and Take My Word for It in 1998, both of which are still available today.

In the US, she was married to Maurice Edwards.

Cassian died of a cardiac arrest or heart attack in New York on 14 April 2014. She is survived by her husband.

Books

 La scara 1/1, Bucharest, 1947
 Sufletul nostru, Bucharest, 1949
 An viu nouă sute şaptesprezece, Bucharest, 1949
 Nică fără frică, Bucharest, 1950
 Ce-a văzut Oana, Bucharest, 1952
 Horea nu mai este singur, Bucharest, 1952
 Tinereţe, Bucharest, 1953
 Florile patriei, Bucharest, 1954
 Versuri alese, Bucharest, 1955
 Vârstele anului, Bucharest, 1957
 Dialogul vântului cu marea, Bucharest, 1957
 Botgros, căţel fricos, Bucharest, 1957
 Prinţul Miorlau, Bucharest, 1957
 Chipuri hazlii pentru copii, Bucharest, 1958
 Aventurile lui Trompişor, Bucharest, 1959
 Încurcă-lume, Bucharest, 1961
 Sărbătorile zilnice, Bucharest, 1961
 Spectacol în aer liber. O monografie a dragostei, Bucharest, 1961
 Curcubeu, Bucharest, 1962
 Poezii, foreword by Ovid S. Crohmălniceanu, Bucharest, 1962
 Să ne facem daruri, Bucharest, 1963
 Disciplina harfei, Bucharest, 1965
 Îl cunoaşteţi pe Tică?, Bucharest, 1966
 Sângele, Bucharest, 1966
 Destinele paralele. La scara 1/1,1967
 Uite-l este... Uite-l nu e, Bucharest, 1967
 Ambitus, Bucharest, 1969
 Întâmplări cu haz, Bucharest, 1969
 Povestea a doi pui de tigru numiţi Ninigra şi Aligru, Bucharest, 1969
 Cronofagie. 1944-1969, Bucharest, 1970
 Recviem, Bucharest, 1971
 Marea conjugare, Bucharest, 1971
 Atât de grozavă şi adio. Confidenţe fictive, Bucharest, 1971; Second edition (Confidenţe fictive. Atât de grozavă şi adio şi alte proze), Bucharest, 1976
 Loto-Poeme, Bucharest, 1971
 Spectacol în aer liber. O (altă) monografie a dragostei, foreword by Liviu Călin, Bucharest, 1974
 Între noi, copii, Bucharest, 1974
 O sută de poeme, Bucharest, 1975
 Viraje-Virages, bilingual edition, translated by the author, Eugene Guillevic and Lily Denis, Bucharest, 1978
 De îndurare, Bucharest, 1981
 Blue Apple, translation by Eva Feiler, New York, 1981
 Numărătoarea inversă, Bucharest, 1983
 Jocuri de vacanţă, Bucharest, 1983
 Roşcată ca arama şi cei şapte şoricei, Bucharest, 1985
 Copper Red and the Seven Dachsies, 1985
 Lady of Miracles, translation by Laura Schiff, Berkeley, 1988
 Call Yourself Alive, translation by Brenda Walker and Andreea Deletant, London, 1988
 Life Sentence, New York-London, 1990
 Cheerleader for a Funeral, translation by the author and Brenda Walker, London-Boston, 1992
 Desfacerea lumii, Bucharest, 1997
 Take My Word for It, New York, 1997
 Something Old, Something New: Poems and Drawings, Tuscaloosa, 2002
 Memoria ca zestre, Cartea I (1948–1953, 1975–1979, 1987–2003), Cartea a II-a (1954–1985, 2003–2004), Cartea a III-a (1985–2005), Bucharest, 2003–2005
 Continuum, New York, 2009

Presence in English language anthologies

 Testament - 400 Years of Romanian Poetry - 400 de ani de poezie românească - bilingual edition - Daniel Ioniță (editor and principal translator) with Daniel Reynaud, Adriana Paul & Eva Foster - Editura Minerva, 2019 - 
 Romanian Poetry from its Origins to the Present - bilingual edition English/Romanian - Daniel Ioniță (editor and principal translator) with Daniel Reynaud, Adriana Paul and Eva Foster - Australian-Romanian Academy Publishing - 2020 -  ; 
 Born in Utopia - An anthology of Modern and Contemporary Romanian Poetry - Carmen Firan and Paul Doru Mugur (editors) with Edward Foster - Talisman House Publishers - 2006 - 
 Testament - Anthology of Romanian Verse - American Edition - monolingual English language edition - Daniel Ioniță (editor and principal translator) with Eva Foster, Daniel Reynaud and Rochelle Bews - Australian-Romanian Academy for Culture - 2017 -

References

External links
 Audio: Nina Cassian reads 'Epilogue' - poemsoutloud.net
 Desert Island Discs appearance (14 February 1999)

Censorship in Romania
Jewish poets
People from Galați
Romanian expatriates in the United States
Romanian defectors
Jewish Romanian writers
Romanian journalists
20th-century Romanian poets
Romanian translators
Romanian children's writers
The New Yorker people
The Atlantic (magazine) people
1924 births
2014 deaths
Romanian women children's writers
20th-century translators
20th-century Romanian women writers
International Writing Program alumni
21st-century Romanian poets
Romanian women poets
21st-century Romanian women writers